The 2004 season of the 3. divisjon, the fourth highest association football league for men in Norway.

22 games were played in 24 groups, with 3 points given for wins and 1 for draws. Twelve teams were promoted to the 2. divisjon through playoff.

Tables 

Group 1
Sarpsborg – won playoff
Fredrikstad 2
Østsiden
Sparta Sarpsborg 2
Lisleby
Moss 2
Kvik Halden 2
Greåker
Kolbotn
Klemetsrud
Navestad – relegated
Oppegård – relegated

Group 2
KFUM – lost playoff
Årvoll
Rygge
Sprint-Jeløy 2
Follo 2
Råde
Trøgstad/Båstad
Selbak
Rakkestad
Fagerborg
Askim – relegated
Spydeberg – relegated

Group 3
Strømmen – lost playoff
Grei
Lyn 2
Fet
Bygdø
Kjelsås 2
Grorud
Fjellhamar
Nittedal
Focus – relegated
Grüner
Kurland – relegated

Group 4
Jevnaker – lost playoff
Korsvoll
Åmot
Hønefoss SK
St. Hanshaugen
Konnerud
Åskollen
Hadeland
Mercantile 2
Hønefoss BK 2
Røa
Nordstrand – relegated

Group 5
Groruddalen – won playoff
Kongsvinger 2
Sander
Skeid 2
Høland
Galterud
Sørumsand
Grue
Rælingen
Funnefoss/Vormsund
Rasta – relegated
Leirsund – relegated

Group 6
Brumunddal – won playoff
Ham-Kam 2
Hamar
Ringsaker
Bjerke
Fart
Eidsvold
Skjetten 2 – relegated
Trysil
Vang
Ottestad
Furnes – relegated

Group 7
Raufoss 2
FF Lillehammer – won playoff
Kolbu/KK
Vardal
Lom
SAFK Fagernes
Ringebu/Fåvang
Ihle
Vind
Toten
Vågå – relegated
Follebu – relegated

Group 8
Mjøndalen – lost playoff
Vålerenga 2
Asker
Fossum
Ullern
Drafn
Birkebeineren
Åssiden
Strømsgodset 2
Solberg
Øvrevoll/Hosle
Bækkelaget – relegated

Group 9
Eik-Tønsberg – lost playoff
Larvik Turn
Runar
Holmestrand
Flint
Ivrig
Borre
Stokke
Sandar
Larvik Fotball 2
Ørn-Horten 2 – relegated
Falk – relegated

Group 10
Notodden – won playoff
Langesund/Stathelle
Skarphedin
Pors Grenland 2
Herkules
Odd Grenland 3
Urædd
Brevik
Skotfoss
Fyresdal
Drangedal – relegated
Seljord – relegated

Group 11
Flekkerøy – won playoff
Lyngdal
Jerv
Vindbjart
Start 2
Våg
Søgne
Grane
Mandalskameratene 2
Vigør
Randesund – relegated
Trauma – relegated

Group 12
Bryne 2
Randaberg – lost playoff
Vaulen
Buøy
Sola
Vardeneset
Varhaug
Staal Jørpeland
Frøyland
Figgjo
Madla – relegated
Riska – relegated

Group 13
Egersund – won playoff
Kopervik
Haugesund 2
Åkra
Nord
Skjold
Eiger
Havørn
Bjerkreim
Hundvåg
Hana – relegated
Torvastad – relegated

Group 14
Stord/Moster – won playoff
Os
Gneist
Lyngbø
Bremnes
Austevoll
Trio
Solid
Halsnøy
Trott
Fitjar – relegated
Tertnes – relegated

Group 15
Nest-Sotra – lost playoff
Askøy
Radøy/Manger
Varegg
Vadmyra
Arna-Bjørnar
Voss
Follese
Frøya
Hald
Bergen Nord – relegated
Bergen Sparta – relegated

Group 16
Førde – lost playoff
Stryn
Fjøra
Tornado Måløy
Sogndal 2
Saga – relegated (voluntarily)
Skavøypoll
Høyang
Florø
Sandane
Dale
Eid – relegated

Group 17
Skarbøvik – lost playoff
Valder
Bergsøy
Langevåg
Sykkylven
Hareid
Aalesund 2
Spjelkavik
Ørsta
Godøy – relegated
Brattvåg – relegated
Hødd 2 – relegated

Group 18
Træff – won playoff
Kristiansund
Averøykameratene
Surnadal
Sunndal
Gossen
Dahle
Bud
Bryn
Eide og Omegn
Åndalsnes
Halsa/Valsøyfjord – relegated

Group 19
Ranheim – won playoff
Nardo
Orkla
Tynset
KIL/Hemne
Flå
Nidelv 2 – relegated
Melhus
Kvik
Buvik
Røros – relegated
Sokna – relegated

Group 20
Stjørdals-Blink – lost playoff
Rørvik
Verdal
Namsos
Strindheim 2
Fram
Bjørgan
Malvik
Beitstad – relegated
NTNUI
Selbu
Rissa

Group 21
Innstranden – won playoff
Steigen
Stålkameratene
Mo 2
Fauske/Sprint
Mosjøen
Bodø/Glimt 2
Saltdalkameratene
Brønnøysund
Junkeren
Nordre Meløy
Herøy/Dønna

Group 22
Grovfjord – lost playoff
Leknes
Ballstad
Skånland
Hadsel
Morild
Ballangen
Medkila
Landsås – relegated
Sandtorg – relegated
Vesterålen 2 – relegated
Bjerkvik – relegated

Group 23
Lyngen/Karnes – won playoff
Tromsø 2
Tromsdalen 2
Ishavsbyen
Ramfjord
Fløya
Senja
Nordreisa
Skjervøy
Storsteinnes
Finnsnes – relegated
Nordkjosbotn – relegated

Group 24
Bossekop – lost playoff
Kirkenes
Hammerfest
Kautokeino
Tverrelvdalen
Båtsfjord
Sørøy/Glimt
Porsanger
Alta 2
Norild
Polarstjernen – relegated
Rafsbotn – relegated

Playoffs

References
NIFS

Norwegian Third Division seasons
4
Norway
Norway